Qeshlaq-e Qarqoli Rahim Talbi (also Romanized as Qeshlāq-e Qārqolī Raḥīm Ţālbī) is a village in Qeshlaq-e Sharqi Rural District, Qeshlaq Dasht District, Bileh Savar County, Ardabil Province, Iran. At the 2006 census, its population was 26, in 6 families.

References 

Populated places in Bileh Savar County
Towns and villages in Bileh Savar County